"You and I (We Can Conquer the World)" is a song written and sung by Stevie Wonder from his 1972 album Talking Book. Wonder is also credited for playing piano and T.O.N.T.O. synthesizer on the song.

Personnel
Stevie Wonder – lead vocal, piano, T.O.N.T.O. synthesizer, Moog bass

Cover versions
Barbra Streisand included a rendition of the song in her 1975 album Lazy Afternoon. This is the first time the song is listed and released as "You and I".
In a sixth season episode of the CBS sitcom Good Times, Michael Evans (Ralph Carter) performs the song at the wedding of his sister Thelma (Bern Nadette Stanis) to Keith Anderson (Ben Powers).
Santita Jackson performed the song at the 1992 wedding of Barack and Michelle Obama
O'Bryan recorded the song as the title cut from his 1983 album of the same name.
Joe Cocker recorded a cover for his 1996 album Organic.
Vesta Williams included a cover in her 1998 album Relationships.
Mariah Carey sang the song on BET's Walk of Fame honoring Stevie Wonder on October 29, 2002.
Michael Bublé recorded a version for his 2005 album It's Time.
Trijntje Oosterhuis recorded a cover for her 2011 album Sundays in New York.
Macy Gray included the song on her 2012 Stevie Wonder tribute album Talking Book. It is listed as "You and I (We Can Conquer the World)".
Jacob Collier covered the tune on his 2016 debut album In My Room. This cover won him the 2017 Grammy Award for Best Arrangement, Instrumental or A Cappella.

George Michael version

In April 2011, George Michael released a version of the song titled just "You and I" solely on MP3 as a gift to Prince William and Catherine Middleton on the occasion of their wedding on April 29, 2011.

Although the MP3 was downloadable for free, Michael asked that downloaders make a contribution to the "Prince William & Miss Catherine Middleton Charitable Gift Fund".

The song had its world premiere on April 15, 2011 on CNN's Piers Morgan Tonight. The show repeated on Saturday, April 16.

References

External links 
 List of cover versions of "You and I (We Can Conquer the World)" at SecondHandSongs.com

1972 songs
Stevie Wonder songs
George Michael songs
Songs written by Stevie Wonder
Song recordings produced by Stevie Wonder